Anguiano is a surname originating in Spain. Notable people with the surname include:

 Armando Ayala Anguiano (1928–2013), independent journalist, historian, editor, entrepreneur and novelist
 Carlos Anguiano (born 1999), American professional soccer player
 Eduardo Montagner Anguiano, Chipilo Venetian writer
 Humberto Anguiano (born 1910, date of death unknown), Mexican modern pentathlete
 Karen Quiroga Anguiano (born 1980), Mexican politician 
 Lupe Anguiano (born 1929), Mexican-American civil rights activist
 Mario Anguiano Moreno (born 1962), Mexican politician and Governor of Colima from 2009 to 2015
 Raúl Anguiano (1915–2006), Mexican painter
 Sergio Salvador Aguirre Anguiano (born 1943), Mexican jurist and Associate Justice of the Supreme Court of Justice of the Nation

See also
 Anguiano, a small town in the province of La Rioja, Spain
 Comarca de Anguiano, a comarca in La Rioja province in Spain